Mount Hartkopf is a mountain,  high, rising along the east side of the upper reaches of Land Glacier,  southeast of Mount McCoy, in Marie Byrd Land, Antarctica. It was mapped by the United States Geological Survey from surveys and U.S. Navy air photos, 1959–65, and was named by the Advisory Committee on Antarctic Names for Kenneth W. Hartkopt, a United States Antarctic Research Program ionospheric physicist at Byrd Station in 1963.

References

Mountains of Marie Byrd Land